Civil society can be understood as the "third sector" of society, distinct from government and business, and including the family and the private sphere. By other authors, civil society is used in the sense of
1) the aggregate of non-governmental organizations and institutions that advance the interests and will of citizens or
2) individuals and organizations in a society which are independent of the government.

Sometimes the term civil society is used in the more general sense of "the elements such as freedom of speech, an independent judiciary, etc, that make up a democratic society" (Collins English Dictionary). Especially in the discussions among thinkers of Eastern and Central Europe, civil society is seen also as a normative concept of civic values.

Etymology
The term civil society goes back to Aristotle's phrase koinōnía politikḗ, occurring in his Politics, where it refers to a 'political community' commensurate with the Greek city-state (polis), describing a group established by human individuals for the sake of their collective survival. The telos or end of civil society, thus defined, was eudaimonia (tò eu zēn) (often translated as human flourishing or common well-being), in as man was defined as a ‘political (social) animal’ ( zōon politikón). The concept was used by Roman writers, such as Cicero, where it referred to the ancient notion of a republic (res publica). It re-entered into Western political discourse following one of the late medieval translations of Aristotle's Politics into Latin by Leonardo Bruni who as a first translated koinōnía politikḗ into societas civilis. With the rise of a distinction between monarchical autonomy and public law, the term then gained currency to denote the corporate estates (Ständestaat) of a feudal elite of land-holders as opposed to the powers exercised by the prince. It had a long history in state theory, and was revived with particular force in recent times, in Eastern Europe, where dissidents such as Václav Havel as late as in the 1990s employed it to denote the sphere of civic associations threatened by the intrusive holistic state-dominated regimes of Communist Eastern Europe. The first post-modern usage of civil society as denoting political opposition stems from writings of Aleksander Smolar in 1978–79. However, the term was not in use by Solidarity labor union in 1980–1981.

Democracy
The literature on relations between civil society and democratic political society has its immediate origins in Scottish Enlightenment philosophy, including Adam Ferguson's An Essay on the History of Civil Society, and in the work of G. W. F. Hegel, from whom the concepts were adapted by Alexis de Tocqueville, Karl Marx, and Ferdinand Tönnies. They were developed in significant ways by 20th century researchers Gabriel Almond and Sidney Verba, who identified the role of political culture in a democratic order as vital.

They argued that the political element of political organizations facilitates better awareness and a more informed citizenry, who make better voting choices, participate in politics, and hold government more accountable as a result. Civil society acts as a forum for people with common goals and interests to further develop democratic ideals, which in turn can lead to a more democratic state. Membership in these kinds of associations serves as a source of information which reduces the barriers to collective action. These groups then affect policy by putting pressure on governments. This implies that civil society serves to balance the power of the state. The statutes of these political organizations have been considered micro-constitutions because they accustom participants to the formalities of democratic decision making.

More recently, Robert D. Putnam has argued that even non-political organizations in civil society are vital for democracy because they build social capital, trust, and shared values within a society. Social capital, as defined as the social networks and norms of reciprocity associated with them, can help societies resolve dilemmas of collective action; individuals with dense social networks are more likely to credibly commit to other members of society and leverage their social capital to build public goods. In turn, countries with strong civil societies are more likely to succeed as democracies. Some scholars have built on Putnam’s claim and argued that the participation of a specific type of civil society organization—non-political organizations rooted in quotidian relationships—in the democratic transition process is what drives successful democratic transitions. Gianfranco Poggi argues this as well, saying that interpersonal trust is needed if republican society is to be maintained.

Others, however, have questioned the link between civil society and robust democracy. As Thomas Carothers points out, civil societies do not necessarily form for worthy reasons nor do they necessarily promote democratic values. For example, Sheri Berman argued that civil society organizations can actually be used to mobilize people against democracy. This was evident in fall of the Weimar Republic in Germany. The Weimar Republic’s failure to address the ravages of economic depression, and domestic struggles, led to the creation of a multitude of German civil societies. A defining and arguable fatal flaw of these groups was they reinforced societal conflicts and differences among Germans. This separation of German society into individual social groups meant they were incredibly vulnerable to nationalist ideals. Nazis infiltrated these discontent groups where they eventually became the backbone and foundation for the party and its propaganda. As a result, the Nazi party transformed itself from a place of political irrelevancy to the largest party in the German Reichstag after the 1932 elections. Contrary to Putnam’s argument, in this instance, a dense civil society network had damaged democracy. The Nazi Party exploited the societal organization of Germany ultimately leading to the fall of the nation's first ever republic.

Even in well-established democracies, the proliferation of special interest groups—which signal a strong civil society—can potentially impede the functioning of representative institutions and distort policy outcomes in favor of the wealthy, well-connected, or well-organized. Moreover, based on survey data collected by Kenneth Newton, there is little evidence that social and political trust overlap, which renders the relationship between the strength of civil society and democracy obsolete. Indeed, as Larry Diamond asserts, in order to understand the multitude of ways civil society can serve democracy, it is also necessary to understand the tensions and contradictions civil society generates for democracy.

In the United States, Tocqueville states that the tendency to form associations that would manifest into civil societies has propelled its success as a democratic government. Putnam argues that the strength of civil societies in the U.S. have historically brought more social trust and more social capital for citizens. Others state that a dependence on civil societies can lead citizens to question the effectiveness of the U.S. government and can create instability by dividing society.

In modern America, Yuval Levin writes that civil societies are considered to be a gateway between the U.S. government and citizens Some state that civil societies help maintain individual freedoms as a check to the U.S. government’s power, while others see its role as upholding the state’s efforts by helping it fuel social causes while constraining the un-democratic consolidation of power. Others, such as David Rieff, point out that the U.S. government is more financially equipped to work on social causes than civil societies like NGOs, who prove inadequate due to their lack of relative strength. Research by Harvard professor Theda Skocpol indicates that though civil societies have brought more democracy to America, the shift from large unions and organizations to smaller movements targeting specific political issues is less likely to spurn large-scale participation in democracy. Galston and Levine state these new civil societies have proved to be less likely to engage in the political process and more likely to bring social activism.

Political participation
Civil society organizations provide citizens with knowledge crucial to political participation, such as the obligations and rights of citizens with regard to government processes, different types of political issues and policy agendas, ways in which citizens can collaborate to address societal issues, and approaches to creating meaningful change in communities. Dr. Carew E. Boulding and Dr. Jami Nelson-Núñez assert that civil society organizations are beneficial in that citizens are more inclined to participate politically when they can act collectively and develop associative solidarities with others around shared policy preferences. Other scholars, however, note that there are some drawbacks of civil society organizations as it pertains to political participation and  policy processes. Dr. Thomas Carothers explains that, because civil society organizations have such an influential role in political participation, the proliferation of these organizations has made it increasingly difficult for governments  to meet both the widening range of policy preferences and rapidly changing social needs. The scholar David Rieff discusses another issue tied to civil society and political participation: single-issue activism. Since most civil society organizations focus on one sector or societal issue, this sometimes causes voters to shift their attention away from the multifaceted broad issues facing society, such as the challenges of globalization, and instead the focus of elections becomes centered on a few specific hot-button topics, such as abortion.

There is a considerable amount of data supporting the notion that civil society organizations significantly increase political participation. Dr. Robert Putnam conducted a study of civil society in Italy in the mid-1900s, and observed that those who were engaged with civil society organizations demonstrated greater “political sophistication, social trust, political participation, and ‘subjective civic competence’” than those not involved in these organizations. Similarly, Dr. Sheri Berman found that the NSDAP (Nazi Party) civil society organization leveraged strong civil society networks among the middle class together for the purpose of mobilizing for political participation in Germany. The powerful influence of these efforts is evidenced by the NSDAP becoming the most potent political force in the nation in the mid-1900s. These case studies provide evidence of the crucial role of social networks in facilitating political participation and civic engagement.

Economics 
A strong civil society is often considered to be important for economic growth, with reasoning being that it can give important input on economic decisions, facilitate private enterprise and entrepreneurship, and prevent the state from stifling the economy. For example, labor leaders can ensure that economic growth benefits working people, faith leaders can advocate for greater inclusion in economic affairs, NGOs can flag and document harmful business practices, etc.

Essentially, civil society creates social capital, which the World Bank defines as "the institutions, relationships, and norms that shape the quality and quantity of a society's social interactions". With higher social capital comes a greater amount of social interdependence, which increases productivity and economic growth. For example, one study found that high school drop out rates in areas within the United States with better social networks were lower than in areas with weaker social networks.

Some, like Thomas Carothers, somewhat dispute this narrative. He argues that although civil society is beneficial toward economic growth, it is not necessary, which he illustrates through how South Korea's great economic success was built without a strong civil society, which only appeared after economic growth had more than took off, as well as how Bangladesh, with an incredibly rich civil society, has largely failed to grow its economy, remaining one of the poorest countries in the world. Going even further, Carothers also points out how too much civil society, at least in certain sectors, can lead to harmful economic impacts, citing how some economists believe labor unions in Latin America have restricted economic growth.

Constitutional economics
Constitutional economics is a field of economics and constitutionalism which describes and analyzes the specific interrelationships between constitutional issues and functioning of the economy including budget process. The term "constitutional economics" was used by American economist James M. Buchanan as a name for a new budget planning and the latter's transparency to the civil society, are of the primary guiding importance to the implementation of the rule of law. Also, the availability of an effective court system, to be used by the civil society in situations of unfair government spending and executive impoundment of any previously authorized appropriations, becomes a key element for the success of any influential civil society.

Global

Critics and activists currently often apply the term civil society to the domain of social life which needs to be protected against globalization, and to the sources of resistance thereto, because it is seen as acting beyond boundaries and across different territories. However, as civil society can, under many definitions, include and be funded and directed by those businesses and institutions (especially donors linked to European and Northern states) who support globalization, this is a contested use. Rapid development of civil society on the global scale after the fall of the communist system was a part of neo-liberal strategies linked to the Washington Consensus. Some studies have also been published, which deal with unresolved issues regarding the use of the term in connection with the impact and conceptual power of the international aid system (see for example Tvedt 1998).

On the other hand, others see globalization as a social phenomenon expanding the sphere of classical liberal values, which inevitably led to a larger role for civil society at the expense of politically derived state institutions.

The integrated Civil Society Organizations (iCSO) System, developed by the Department of Economic and Social Affairs (DESA), facilitates interactions between civil society organizations and DESA.

Civil societies also have become involved in the environmental policy making process. These groups impact environmental policies by setting an agenda on fixing the harm done to the environment. They also get the public informed about environmental issues, which increases the public demand for environmental change.

History

From a historical perspective, the actual meaning of the concept of civil society has changed twice from its original, classical form. The first change occurred after the French Revolution, the second during the fall of communism in Europe.

Western antiquity
The concept of civil society in its pre-modern classical republican understanding is usually connected to the early-modern thought of Age of Enlightenment in the 18th century.  However, it has much older history in the realm of political thought. Generally, civil society has been referred to as a political association governing social conflict through the imposition of rules that restrain citizens from harming one another. In the classical period, the concept was used as a synonym for the good society, and seen as indistinguishable from the state. For instance, Socrates taught that conflicts within society should be resolved through public argument using ‘dialectic’, a form of rational dialogue to uncover truth. According to Socrates, public argument through ‘dialectic’ was imperative to ensure ‘civility’ in the polis and ‘good life’ of the people. For Plato, the ideal state was a just society in which people dedicate themselves to the common good, practice civic virtues of wisdom, courage, moderation and justice, and perform the occupational role to which they were best suited. It was the duty of the ‘philosopher king’ to look after people in civility. Aristotle thought the polis was an ‘association of associations’ that enables citizens to share in the virtuous task of ruling and being ruled. His koinonia politike as political community.

The concept of societas civilis is Roman and was introduced by Cicero. The political discourse in the classical period, places importance on the idea of a ‘good society’ in ensuring peace and order among the people. The philosophers in the classical period did not make any distinction between the state and society. Rather they held that the state represented the civil form of society and ‘civility’ represented the requirement of good citizenship. Moreover, they held that human beings are inherently rational so that they can collectively shape the nature of the society they belong to. In addition, human beings have the capacity to voluntarily gather for the common cause and maintain peace in society. By holding this view, we can say that classical political thinkers endorsed the genesis of civil society in its original sense.

The Middle Ages saw major changes in the topics discussed by political philosophers. Due to the unique political arrangements of feudalism, the concept of classical civil society practically disappeared from mainstream discussion. Instead conversation was dominated by problems of just war, a preoccupation that would last until the end of Renaissance.

Early modern history
The Thirty Years' War and the subsequent Treaty of Westphalia heralded the birth of the sovereign states system. The Treaty endorsed states as territorially-based political units having sovereignty. As a result, the monarchs were able to exert domestic control by circumventing the feudal lords by raising their own armed troops. Henceforth, monarchs could form national armies and deploy a professional bureaucracy and fiscal departments, which enabled them to maintain direct control and authority over their subjects. In order to meet administrative expenditures, monarchs exerted greater control over the economy. This gave birth to absolutism. Until the mid-eighteenth century, absolutism was the hallmark of Europe.

The absolutist concept of the state was disputed in the Enlightenment period.  As a natural consequence of Renaissance, Humanism, and the scientific revolution, the Enlightenment thinkers raised fundamental questions such as "What legitimacy does heredity confer?", "Why are governments instituted?", "Why do some human beings have more basic rights than others?", and so on. These questions led them to make certain assumptions about the nature of the human mind, the sources of political and moral authority, the reasons behind absolutism, and how to move beyond absolutism. The Enlightenment thinkers believed in the power of the human mind to reason. They opposed the alliance between the state and the Church as the enemy of human progress and well-being because the coercive apparatus of the state curbed individual liberty and the Church legitimated monarchs by positing the theory of divine origin. Therefore, both were deemed to be against the will of the people.

Strongly influenced by the atrocities of Thirty Years' War, the political philosophers of the time held that social relations should be ordered in a different way from natural law conditions. Some of their attempts led to the emergence of social contract theory that contested social relations existing in accordance with human nature. They held that human nature can be understood by analyzing objective realities and natural law conditions. Thus they endorsed that the nature of human beings should be encompassed by the contours of state and established positive laws. Thomas Hobbes underlined the need of a powerful state to maintain civility in society. For Hobbes, human beings are motivated by self-interests (Graham 1997:23). Moreover, these self-interests are often contradictory in nature. Therefore, in state of nature, there was a condition of a war of all against all. In such a situation, life was "solitary, poor, nasty, brutish and short" (Ibid: 25). Upon realizing the danger of anarchy, human beings became aware of the need of a mechanism to protect them. As far as Hobbes was concerned, rationality and self-interests persuaded human beings to combine in agreement, to surrender sovereignty to a common power (Kaviraj 2001:289). Hobbes called this common power, state, Leviathan.

John Locke had a similar concept to Hobbes about the political condition in England. It was the period of the Glorious Revolution, marked by the struggle between the divine right of the Crown and the political rights of Parliament. This influenced Locke to forge a social contract theory of a limited state and a powerful society. In Locke's view, human beings led also an unpeaceful life in the state of nature. However, it could be maintained at the sub-optimal level in the absence of a sufficient system (Brown 2001:73). From that major concern, people gathered together to sign a contract and constituted a common public authority. Nevertheless, Locke held that the consolidation of political power can be turned into autocracy, if it is not brought under reliable restrictions (Kaviraj 2001:291). Therefore, Locke set forth two treaties on government with reciprocal obligations. In the first treaty, people submit themselves to the common public authority. This authority has the power to enact and maintain laws. The second treaty contains the limitations of authority, i. e., the state has no power to threaten the basic rights of human beings. As far as Locke was concerned, the basic rights of human beings are the preservation of life, liberty and property. Moreover, he held that the state must operate within the bounds of civil and natural laws.

Both Hobbes and Locke had set forth a system, in which peaceful coexistence among human beings could be ensured through social pacts or contracts. They considered civil society as a community that maintained civil life, the realm where civic virtues and rights were derived from natural laws. However, they did not hold that civil society was a separate realm from the state. Rather, they underlined the co-existence of the state and civil society. The systematic approaches of Hobbes and Locke (in their analysis of social relations) were largely influenced by the experiences in their period. Their attempts to explain human nature, natural laws, the social contract and the formation of government had challenged the divine right theory. In contrast to divine right, Hobbes and Locke claimed that humans can design their political order. This idea had a great impact on the thinkers in the Enlightenment period.

The Enlightenment thinkers argued that human beings are rational and can shape their destiny. Hence, no need of an absolute authority to control them. Both Jean-Jacques Rousseau, a critic of civil society, and Immanuel Kant argued that people are peace lovers and that wars are the creation of absolute regimes (Burchill 2001:33). As far as Kant was concerned, this system was effective to guard against the domination of a single interest and check the tyranny of the majority (Alagappa 2004:30).

Modern history

G. W. F. Hegel completely changed the meaning of civil society, giving rise to a modern liberal understanding of it as a form of non-political society as opposed to institutions of modern nation state. While in classical republicanism civil society where synonymous with political society, Hegel distinguished political state and civil society, what was followed by Tocqueville's distinction between civil and political societies and associations, repeated by Marx and Tönnies.

Unlike his predecessors, Hegel considered civil society as a separate realm, a "system of needs", that is the, "[stage of] difference which intervenes between the family and the state". Civil society is the realm of economic relationships as it exists in the modern industrial capitalist society, for it had emerged at the particular period of capitalism and served its interests: individual rights and private property. Hence, he used the German term "bürgerliche Gesellschaft" to denote civil society as "civilian society" – a sphere regulated by the civil code. This new way of thinking about civil society was followed by Alexis de Tocqueville and Karl Marx as well. For Hegel, civil society manifested contradictory forces. Being the realm of capitalist interests, there is a possibility of conflicts and inequalities within it (ex: mental and physical aptitude, talents and financial circumstances). He argued that these inequalities influence the choices that members are able to make in relation to the type of work they will do. The diverse positions in Civil Society fall into three estates: the substantial estate (agriculture), the formal estate (trade and industry), and the universal estate (civil society). A man is able to choose his estate, though his choice is limited by the aforementioned inequalities. However, Hegel argues that these inequalities enable all estates in Civil Society to be filled, which leads to a more efficient system on the whole.

Karl Marx followed the Hegelian way of using the concept of civil society. For Marx, the emergence of the modern state created a realm of civil society that reduced society to private interests competing against each other. Political society was autonomised into the state, which was in turn ruled by the bourgeois class (consider also that suffrage only belonged, then, to propertied men). Marx, in his early writings, anticipated the abolition of the separation between state and civil society, and looked forward to the reunification of private and public/political realms (Colletti, 1975). Hence, Marx rejected the positive role of state put forth by Hegel. Marx argued that the state cannot be a neutral problem solver. Rather, he depicted the state as the defender of the interests of the bourgeoisie. He considered the state to be the executive arm of the bourgeoisie, which would wither away once the working class took democratic control of society.

The above view about civil society was criticised by Antonio Gramsci (Edwards 2004:10). Departing somewhat from Marx, Gramsci did not consider civil society as a realm of private and alienated relationships. Rather, Gramsci viewed civil society as the vehicle for bourgeois hegemony, when it just represents a particular class. He underlined the crucial role of civil society as the contributor of the cultural and ideological capital required for the survival of the hegemony of capitalism. Rather than posing it as a problem, as in earlier Marxist conceptions, Gramsci viewed civil society as the site for problem-solving. Misunderstanding Gramsci, the New Left assigned civil society a key role in defending people against the state and the market and in asserting the democratic will to influence the state. At the same time, neo-liberal thinkers consider civil society as a site for struggle to subvert Communist and authoritarian regimes. Thus, the term civil society occupies an important place in the political discourses of the New Left and neo-liberals.

Post-modern history

It is commonly believed that the post-modern way of understanding civil society was first developed by political opposition in the former Soviet bloc East European countries in the 1980s. However, research shows that communist propaganda had the most important influence on the development and popularization of the idea instead, in an effort to legitimize neoliberal transformation in 1989. According to theory of restructurization of welfare systems, a new way of using the concept of civil society became a neoliberal ideology legitimizing development of the third sector as a substitute for the welfare state. The recent development of the third sector is a result of this welfare systems restructuring, rather than of democratization.

From that time stems a political practice of using the idea of civil society instead of political society. Henceforth, postmodern usage of the idea of civil society became divided into two main ones: as political society and as the third sector – apart from plethora of definitions. The Washington Consensus of the 1990s, which involved conditioned loans by the World Bank and IMF to debt-laden developing states, also created pressures for states in poorer countries to shrink. This in turn led to practical changes for civil society that went on to influence the theoretical debate. Initially the new conditionality led to an even greater emphasis on "civil society" as a panacea, replacing the state's service provision and social care, Hulme and Edwards suggested that it was now seen as "the magic bullet".

By the end of the 1990s civil society was seen less as a panacea amid the growth of the anti-globalization movement and the transition of many countries to democracy; instead, civil society was increasingly called on to justify its legitimacy and democratic credentials. This led to the creation by the UN of a high level panel on civil society. However, in the 1990s with the emergence of the nongovernmental organizations and the new social movements (NSMs) on a global scale, civil society as a third sector became treated as a key terrain of strategic action to construct ‘an alternative social and world order.’ Post-modern civil society theory has now largely returned to a more neutral stance, but with marked differences between the study of the phenomena in richer societies and writing on civil society in developing states.

Link to the public sphere
Jürgen Habermas said that the public sphere encourages rational will-formation; it is a sphere of rational and democratic social interaction. Habermas analyzes civil society as a sphere of "commodity exchange and social labor" and public sphere as a part of political realm. Habermas argues that even though society was representative of capitalist society, there are some institutions that were part of political society. Transformations in economy brought transformations to the public sphere. Though these transformations happen, a civil society develops into political society when it emerges as non-economic and has a populous aspect, and when the state is not represented by just one political party. There needs to be a locus of authority, and this is where society can begin to challenge authority. Jillian Schwedler points out that civil society emerges with the resurrection of the public sphere when individuals and groups begin to challenge boundaries of permissible behaviour – for example, by speaking out against the regime or demanding a government response to social needs – civil society begins to take shape.

Institutions

Civil society organizations, also known as civic organizations, include among others:

 academia
 activist groups
 charities
 clubs (sports, social, etc.)
 community foundations
 community organizations
 consumer organizations
 cooperatives
 foundations
 non-governmental organizations (NGOs)
 non-profit organizations (NPOs)
 private voluntary organizations (PVOs)
 professional associations
 religious organizations
 social enterprises
 social movement organizations
 statutory corporations
 support groups
 trade unions
 voluntary associations

See also

 Portal:Politics
 Activism
 Anarchism
 Associationalism
 Civic engagement
 Civics
 Civic space
 Civic virtue
 Civil affairs
 Civil inattention
 Civil liberties
 Civil religion
 Civil and political rights
 Communitarianism
 Communism
 Constitutional economics
 Coordination good
 Cultural hegemony
 Democracy
 Foucault–Habermas debate
 Global civics
 Global governance
 Human rights
 Judiciary
 Liberal nationalism
 Mass society
 Non-state actor
 Open society
 Political science
 Public interest litigation
 Rule of law
 Rule According to Higher Law
 Social capital
 Social economy
 Social entrepreneurship
 Social innovation
 Sociology
 Service organization
 Power
 Voluntary sector
 Yearbook of International Organizations

Civil-society scholars

 Jeffrey C. Alexander
 Helmut Anheier
 Andrew Arato
 Phillip Blond
 Benjamin Barber
 Daniel Bell
 Robert N. Bellah
 Walden Bello
 Jean L. Cohen
 Michael Edwards
 Jean Bethke Elshtain
 Amitai Etzioni
 Francis Fukuyama
 Ernest Gellner
 Susan George
 Jürgen Habermas
 Peter Dobkin Hall
 Mary Kaldor
 Barry Dean Karl
 John Keane
 David Korten
 John W. Meyer
 Frank Moulaert
 Michael Oakeshott
 Michael O'Neill
 Elinor Ostrom
 Robert D. Putnam
 Michael Sandel
 Charles Taylor
 Lori Wallach
 Khurram Zaki

References

Citations

Sources 

 Alagappa, Muthiah. Civil Society and Political Change in Asia. Stanford: Stanford University Press, 2004. 
 Colletti, Lucio. ‘Introduction’, in Karl Marx, Early Writings, Pelican, 1975, pp. 7–56. .
 Edwards, Michael. Civil Society. Cambridge, England: Polity Press, 2004. .
 Draper, Hal. Karl Marx's Theory of Revolution (Volume 1: State and Bureaucracy, Volume 2: The Politics of Social Classes). New York: Monthly Review Press, 1977 & 1986.
 Ehrenberg, John. Civil Society: The Critical History of an Idea. New York: New York University Press, 1999.
 Ginsborg, Paul. Italy and Its Discontents: Family, Civil Society, State (2003)
 Gosewinkel, Dieter: Civil Society, European History Online, Mainz: Institute of European History, 2011, retrieved: 24 August 2011.
 Hemmati, Minu. Dodds, Felix. Enayati, Jasmin. and McHarry,Jan downloadable copy of Multistakeholder Processes for Governance and Sustainability:Beyond Deadlock and Conflict
 O'Connell, Brian. Civil Society: The Underpinnings of American Democracy. Medford, Mass:Tufts University Press, 1999. .
 Perlas, Nicolas. Shaping Globalization – Civil Society, Cultural Power and Threefolding. .
 Pollock, Graham. "Civil Society Theory and Euro-Nationalism," Studies In Social & Political Thought , Issue 4, March 2001, pp. 31–56. online
 Soper, Steven C. Building a Civil Society: Associations, Public Life, and the Origins of Modern Italy (2013)
 Tvedt, Terje. Angels of Mercy or Development Diplomats. NGOs & Foreign Aid. Oxford: James Currey, 1998.
 Whaites, Alan, Let's get civil society straight: NGOs and Political Theory, Development in Practice, 1996, 
 Whaites, Alan, NGOs, Civil Society and the State: Avoiding theoretical extremes in real world issues,' Development in Practice 1998 
 Zaleski, Pawel Stefan, Tocqueville on Civilian Society: A Romantic Vision of the Dichotomic Structure of Social Reality, Archiv für Begriffsgeschichte Bd. 50/2008 
 Helmut K. Anheier, Stefan Toepler, International Encyclopedia of Civil Society, Springer-Verlag New York Inc., New York 2010,

External links

 LSE Centre for Civil Society 
 UN and Civil Society
 UNEP Global Civil Society Forum.
 Global Environment Facility Civil Society Network
 EU relations with Civil Society
 UK DFID relations with Civil Society
 Civicus – Worldwide Alliance for Citizen Participation
 Global civil society (PCDF).
 One World Trust Database of Civil Society Self-regulatory Initiatives
 Wiser.org – World Index for Social and Environmental Responsibility – formerly www.civilsociety.org.
 Stakeholder Forum for a Sustainable Future engagement in UN stakeholder relations
 International Society for Third-Sector Research 
 Requier-Desjardins Mélanie & Bied-Charreton Marc, 2007. Science and Civil Society in the fight against desertification. Les dossiers thématiques du CSFD. Issue 6. 40 pp.
 100 years of trends in international civil society by the Union of International Associations
 Interface journal special issue on civil society and social movements

 
Community building
Social economy
Democracy